Love beads are one of the traditional accessories of hippies. They consist of one or more long strings of beads, frequently handmade, worn around the neck by both sexes.  The love bead trend probably evolved from the hippie fascination with non-Western cultures, such as those of Africa, India, and Native America, which make common use of similar beads.

Quotes
"At moments of suburban relaxation, in our circle of semi-bohemian homes, we smoked pot, wore dashikis and love beads, and frugged ourselves into a lather…" —John Updike

"Love beads, mood rings, and candle light. Zodiac says the time is right ...", Janet Jackson, "70s Love Groove"

In popular culture

In music
 Chet Atkins released a single titled "Love Beads" in 1970.
 The Lemon Pipers released a song called "Love Beads and Meditation" in 1968.

In products
 According to the official history of the original 1962 Pier 1 Imports store in San Mateo, California, "Our first customers were post-World War II baby boomers looking for beanbag chairs, love beads and incense."

In television
 In the "Bendin' in the Wind" (2001) episode of the animated series Futurama, Fry, Leela, Amy and Dr. Zoidberg follow Beck's musical tour in a Volkswagen microbus and soon run out of money during their cross country road trip. After inadvertently discovering Dr. Zoidberg naturally produces multicolored pearls as a byproduct of being ill and coughing, the crew fund the rest of their travels by stringing the pearls together and selling them as love beads to highly demanding music festival goers.
 In an episode of The Charlie Brown and Snoopy Show titled "Beads" (1983), Lucy makes love beads for Schroeder.
 In the Mad Men season 6 episode "A Tale of Two Cities", Danny Siegel and other characters whom Don, Roger, and Harry encounter at the Los Angeles parties they attend are wearing love beads.
 In Bewitched, season 5, episode 6, "Mirror, Mirror on the Wall" (Nov. 7, 1968), Endora puts a vanity spell on Darrin. He buys a beaded necklace on his way to work, where a conservative advertising client asks what he's wearing. Darrin replies, “Love beads. They go all the way back to ancient Egypt. The high priest used to wear them.” Later, on his way to a luncheon meeting with the client, Samantha zaps the beads off Darrin, with the words "Come flower power, rip off his beads!"

In print

In Peanuts newspaper comic, Lucy makes love beads for Schroeder who states he does not like Lucy causing her to react violently, snatching the beads back and giving them ultimately to Snoopy who appears in the last panel wearing them.
Originally appearing in 1968, it was seen in syndicated reprint on September 13, 2015.

Notes

External links 
 Today's hipsters borrow a symbol from the Peace-Love-Happiness generation and give it a '90s spin, Chicago Tribune, May 1992
How to Make Love Beads , wikiHow
Love Beads for Ang Lee: Hippie Spirit Celebrated at Taking Woodstock Premiere, New York Observer, July 30, 2009
 Ladylike to groovy, '60s on exhibition, Providence Journal, March 1991
"Love Beads and Meditation"—song/CD by The Lemon Pipers

1960s fashion
Beadwork
Hippie movement
Necklaces
Peace symbols
1960s fads and trends